Choir is an ensemble of singers (or actors).

Choir or quire may also refer to:

Choir or quire 
 Choir (architecture), the area between the nave and sanctuary in a church or cathedral
 One of the divisions of a pipe organ
 A West gallery music group, consisting not only of singers, but also their accompanying village band (more often spelled quire)
 A level in the hierarchy of angels

Choir only 
 Choir, Mongolia, a city in Mongolia
 Choir!, a 2008 four panel manga series by Tenpō Gensui
 "Choir" (song), a song by Guy Sebastian

Quire only 
 Paper quire, a quantity of usually 24 or 25 (1/20 of ream) sheets of paper, though originally a pamphlet of four pages folded to make eight leaves (16 pages)
 Quentin Quire, a fictional comic book character

See also
 Chorus (disambiguation)
 
 Choirboy (disambiguation)
 The Choir (disambiguation)